Shch-307 was a  of the Soviet Navy. Her keel was laid down by Baltiyskiy Zavod in Leningrad on 6 November 1933. She was launched on 1 August 1934 and commissioned on 4 August 1935 in the Baltic Fleet.

Service history
The submarine took part in the whole Baltic Sea campaigns (1939–45), surviving at the war. After the war, she was turned into the floating charging station PZS-5, before being stricken: the conning tower was preserved as a memorial.

References 

1934 ships
Shchuka-class submarines
Ships built in the Soviet Union
World War II submarines of the Soviet Union
Ships built at the Baltic Shipyard
Museum ships in Russia